Chen Yi may refer to:

 Xuanzang (602–664), born as Chen Yi, Chinese Buddhist monk in Tang Dynasty
 Chen Yi (Kuomintang) (1883–1950), Chief Executive of Taiwan Province
 Chen Yi (marshal) (1901–1972), Chinese Communist Party military commander and politician
 Chen Yi (composer) (born 1953), Chinese composer
 Rola Chen (born 1987), Japan-based Chinese gravure idol

Sportspeople
 Chen Yi (tennis) (born 1986), Taiwanese tennis player
 Chen Yi (footballer) (born 1997), Chinese football player
 Chen Yi (field hockey player, born 1997), Chinese field hockey player
 Chen Yi (field hockey player, born 1998), Chinese field hockey player
 Chen Yi (swimmer) (born 2001), Chinese swimmer

See also
 Cheng Yi (disambiguation)